Andrew Lee Maurer (September 30, 1948 – January 3, 2016) was an American football offensive lineman in the NFL for the Atlanta Falcons, New Orleans Saints, Minnesota Vikings, San Francisco 49ers, and the Denver Broncos.  He played in Super Bowl IX as a member of the Vikings and Super Bowl XII as a member of the Broncos.  He appeared in 109 regular season games, starting 84 of them.  Additionally, he started all seven playoff games he appeared in.  Maurer played college football at the University of Oregon.

Maurer served as head football coach at Cascade Christian High School in Medford, Oregon, from 1992–2010.  He died of cancer on January 3, 2016, at the age of 67.

References

1948 births
2016 deaths
American football offensive linemen
Oregon Ducks football players
Atlanta Falcons players
New Orleans Saints players
Minnesota Vikings players
San Francisco 49ers players
Denver Broncos players
People from Silverton, Oregon
Players of American football from Oregon